Oleg Fotin (born 19 July 1945) is a retired Russian swimmer. He competed at the 1964 Summer Olympics in the 200 m butterfly but failed to reach the finals.

References

External links
Oleg FOTIN. les-sports.info
Фотин Олег. ussr-swimming.ru

1945 births
Living people
Russian male medley swimmers
Soviet male butterfly swimmers
Olympic swimmers of the Soviet Union
Swimmers at the 1964 Summer Olympics
Soviet male medley swimmers
Swimmers from Moscow
Universiade medalists in swimming
Universiade bronze medalists for the Soviet Union
Medalists at the 1965 Summer Universiade
Russian male butterfly swimmers